Kanker may refer to:

 Kanker, Chhattisgarh, a city in India
 Kanker district, Chhattisgarh
 Kanker State, a princely state during the British Raj
The Kanker sisters, a trio of characters from the cartoon Ed, Edd n Eddy
 the Dutch or Indonesian word for cancer

See also
 Canker, many different plant diseases